It's All Good may refer to:

Fictional characters 
Saul Goodman (derived from "S'all good, man"), an alias adopted by James McGill, an attorney with "flexible" morals on the AMC TV series Breaking Bad and Better Call Saul

Films
 It's All Good (2010), a film by Norman England
 It's All Good (2016), a film by Aaron Fronk
 It's All Good: The Damien Dempsey Story, a documentary about Irish singer-songwriter Damien Dempsey

Literature
 It's All Good, a book by Andrew Daddo
 It's All Good (In Your Dreams), a children's novel by Karen McCombie
 It's All Good: Delicious, Easy Recipes that Will Make You Look Good and Feel Great (2013), a cookbook by Gwyneth Paltrow and Julia Turshen

Music

Albums 
 It's All Good (MC Breed album)
 It's All Good (Joe Nichols album)
 It's All Good (Suga-T album)
 It's All Good, an album by Jad Fair and Jason Willett
 It's All Good, an album by Mick Ralphs
 It's All Good, a mix album produced by Tim Lee
 It's All Good, an EP by Seasick Steve
 It's All Good, a 2014 Best Of album by Damien Dempsey

Songs 
 "It's All Good", a song by Bob Dylan from Together Through Life
 "It's All Good", a song by DMX from Flesh of My Flesh, Blood of My Blood
 "It's All Good", a song by Damien Dempsey from Seize the Day
 "It's All Good", a song by Devo
 "It's All Good", a song by El Perro del Mar from Look! It's El Perro del Mar!
 "It's All Good", a song by Fantasia Barrino from Free Yourself
 "It's All Good", a song by Hammer from The Funky Headhunter
 "It's All Good", a song by Master P from Ghetto Bill
 "It's All Good", a song by Toby Keith from Unleashed
 "It's All Good", a song by Will Smith from Big Willie Style
 "Tha Hood (It's All Good)", a song by Cash Money Millionaires from the 1999 film soundtrack The Wood
 "It's All Good", a song by Ne-Yo & Cher Lloyd